Garson may refer to:

Places 
 Garson, Manitoba, Canada
 Garson, Ontario, Canada

Other uses 
 Garson (surname)

See also 
 Garçon (disambiguation)
 Garzon (disambiguation)